Carlos Sablan Camacho (born February 27, 1937) is a Northern Mariana Islander politician who served as the first governor of the Northern Mariana Islands from January 9, 1978 to January 11, 1982.

Biography
Dr. Carlos S. Camacho was born on Saipan. He attended the Fiji School of Medicine and  the University of Hawaii. He practiced medicine until 1967, when he was elected to the Congress of Micronesia. He served as the Pacific islands' chief medical officer of public health from 1969 to 1977. He was also president of the Saipan Democratic Party from 1975 to 1977. In 1976, he was appointed to the Northern Marianas Constitutional Convention. Dr. Camacho is married to Lourdes Camacho and they have seven children.

Governorship
Camacho, a Democrat, was elected the first governor of that new territory in 1977. He served a single term from 1978 to 1982, when he was succeeded by a Republican, Pedro Tenorio.

Taisacan v. Camacho
In 1980, the CNMI legislature passed a budget that would have appropriated over $1.5 million in federal money for capital improvements on the island of Rota. Camacho vetoed this portion of the budget, calling it excessive and inequitable. Leon Taisacan, a Rota resident, then sued Camacho, claiming that his veto violated the terms of the Covenant between the United States and the CNMI. A district court granted summary judgement in favor of Camacho, and then the United States Court of Appeals for the Ninth Circuit dismissed the lawsuit on the grounds that Taisacan did not have standing to sue, as he was not specifically injured by the veto.

References

|-

|-

1937 births
Democratic Party governors of the Northern Mariana Islands
Democratic Party (Northern Mariana Islands) politicians
Fiji School of Medicine alumni
Governors of the Northern Mariana Islands
Living people
Members of the Congress of the Trust Territory of the Pacific Islands
People from Saipan
University of Hawaiʻi alumni